Aravankadu railway station is a train station in Aruvankadu, a hill station town in the Nilgiris district of Tamil Nadu. Located between Coonoor and Udhagamandalam, it is one of the stations on the historic Nilgiri Mountain Railway, currently declared a World Heritage Site by UNESCO. The station is operated by the Southern Railway zone and comes under the Salem railway division. The popular Ooty passenger, passes through the station. The station code is :AVK.

Trains

References

Railway stations in Nilgiris district
Railway stations opened in 1908
1908 establishments in India
Mountain railways in India